The 2020 TCR Middle East season was set to be the fourth season of the TCR Middle East Series. The series was to be promoted by Creventic. The championship was set to start at Dubai Autodrome in Dubai on 9 January and end at Yas Marina Circuit in Abu Dhabi on 17 January.

The champion of the season would have been given a seat in a car in the second-running of the TCR Spa 500 event on the 1-3 of May.

The season was seemingly cancelled shortly before commencement.

Race calendar

Teams and drivers

References

External links 
 

2020 in Emirati motorsport
Middle East Series
TCR Middle East Series